"Denial, Anger, Acceptance" is the third episode of the HBO original series The Sopranos. It was written by Mark Saraceni, directed by Nick Gomez, and originally aired on January 24, 1999.

Starring
 James Gandolfini as Tony Soprano
 Lorraine Bracco as Dr. Jennifer Melfi
 Edie Falco as Carmela Soprano
 Michael Imperioli as Christopher Moltisanti
 Dominic Chianese as Corrado Soprano, Jr.
 Vincent Pastore as Pussy Bonpensiero *
 Steven Van Zandt as Silvio Dante
 Tony Sirico as Paulie Gualtieri
 Robert Iler as Anthony Soprano, Jr. *
 Jamie-Lynn Sigler as Meadow Soprano
 Nancy Marchand as Livia Soprano

* = credit only

Guest starring
 Michael Rispoli as Jackie Aprile, Sr
 Jerry Adler as Hesh Rabkin
 John Ventimiglia as Artie Bucco
 Kathrine Narducci as Charmaine Bucco
 Ned Eisenberg as Ariel
 Chuck Low as Shlomo

Also guest starring

Synopsis
Shlomo Teittleman is the head of a Hasidic Jewish family. His daughter is seeking a divorce from her husband Ariel, who claims that he has built up one of the family businesses, a motel, and will only consent to a divorce if he receives a 50% stake in it. Teittleman approaches Tony, who agrees to remove Ariel's claim in return for a 25% stake. Ariel turns out to be very tough, both emotionally and physically, and will not yield, however much he is beaten up by Silvio and Paulie. They consult Tony, who consults Hesh, who obliquely suggests threatening him with castration; Ariel yields. Teittleman then attempts to renegotiate the agreement; Tony, menacing, refuses.

Jackie remains in the hospital. Tony takes him a dancer from the Bada Bing, posing as a nurse, for a "private party". However, Jackie's condition continues to deteriorate and he is unable to think of anything else.

Artie is still depressed by the loss of his restaurant; the insurance company continues to suspect arson. He and Charmaine cater a charity event at the Sopranos' home; when he complains again, an altercation between him and Tony turns into a boyish food fight. During the event, Carmela offends Charmaine by seeming to treat her like a servant. Afterward, while they are clearing up, Charmaine confides that, years ago, before Carmela and Tony were married, she slept with Tony.

Meadow and one of her friends, Hunter Scangarelo, exhausted from choir practice and studying for the SATs, decide they need speed and go to Christopher for a supply. Chris initially refuses, fearing Tony's wrath if he finds out; his girlfriend Adriana La Cerva convinces him to do it anyway, as the girls are likely to get adulterated and unsafe drugs from less trustworthy dealers. Chris agrees to provide the speed, stressing that Meadow must never speak of it. At the recital Meadow and Hunter, showing subtle signs of methamphetamine use, sing their brief solos successfully.

Chris and Brendan return the stolen truck, and Junior discusses what action to take with his underling, Mikey Palmice, and with Livia. Obliquely, she advises him to punish Chris and to take drastic action against Brendan. Out alone one night, Chris is seized by Russian thugs who prepare to kill him. He thinks they have been sent by Tony because he sold the speed to Meadow. Terrified, he pleads for his life, but it is only a mock execution. Brendan is shot dead by Mikey; Junior glances at the body.

First appearances
 Rosalie Aprile: wife of the acting boss, Jackie Aprile, and friend of Carmela Soprano.
 Hillel Teittleman: co-owner of the Fly Away Motel.

Connections to future episodes 
In the hospital Jackie Aprile, Sr. likens Mikey Palmice to the Grim Reaper. In "From Where to Eternity" Christopher, believing he is in Hell, sees Mikey there. In the same episode, a psychic tells Paulie that Mikey is the leader of the dead souls following him.

Deceased
 Brendan Filone: shot through the eye by Mikey Palmice on orders of Uncle Junior.

Title reference
 Denial, anger, and acceptance are the first, second, and fifth stages, respectively, described in the Kübler-Ross model. These stages pertain to people suffering from terminal illnesses (such as Jackie Aprile); they also apply to any form of catastrophic personal loss, which many other characters face in this and other episodes. 

 Tony has three therapy sessions with Dr. Melfi in this episode. The sessions each depict Tony expressing denial, anger, and acceptance regarding Jackie's illness.

Production
 This is the first episode where Irina is played by Oksana Lada. She was originally portrayed by Siberia Federico in the pilot.

Reception
In a retrospective review, Emily St. James of The A.V. Club wrote that the "[ending] montage - intercut with Tony watching Meadow sing - is one of the first moments when The Sopranos takes music and rises above its prosaic, muddy universe to become something like sublime"; St. James commented that although the episode "is a 'Let's get the plot wheels turning!' kind of episode, and those sorts of episodes can be a little trying from time to time", there is nonetheless "lots of it that is just expertly executed". Alan Sepinwall praised Gandolfini's performance as well as the story involving Carmela and Charmaine, writing that the show "has a really great eye and ear for insults – particularly ones not necessarily intended as such".

Cultural references 
 Tony calls the painting in Melfi's waiting room a "Korshak" test, confusing it with the Rorschach inkblot test. Sidney Korshak was a prominent lawyer and "fixer" known for his involvement with the mob, Hollywood, and those with political power.
 When Tony is in his Russian mistress' bedroom he notices a painting on her wall and asks what she sees in it. The painting, depicting a splash in a pool, is an imitation David Hockney. She says that it reminds her of "David Hockey."
 Ariel the Hassidic Jew who resists Silvio and Tony's intimidation and torture mentions Shlomo the king and the historic Siege of Masada where Jews chose suicide instead of defeat against the Romans.
 When Tony and Silvio meet with Schlomo, Tony refers to him as "ZZ Top", referring to the rock band known for their long beards.
 Hesh tells Tony to "Finish his bris (circumcision)." "Make like a mohel (man who performs circumcisions)."

Filming locations 
In order of first appearance:

 Wayne, New Jersey
 Washington Middle School in Harrison, New Jersey
 Satriale's Pork Store in Kearny, New Jersey
 North Caldwell, New Jersey
 Kearny, New Jersey

Music
 The song played on Christopher's car radio after he and Brendan return the stolen truck is "Gawk" by Ethyline.
 The song played when Junior and Mikey eat dinner and discuss the situation regarding Christopher and Brendan is "Melodia del Rio" by Rubén González. 
 The song played when Meadow and Hunter are discussing buying meth over the phone is "This Is How We Roll" by Bedroom Productions.
The song played when Christopher delivers the crystal meth to Meadow in her room is "Turn of the Century" by Damon and Naomi.
 The song played when Carmela has her fundraising dinner for a pediatric hospital is "Happy Feet" by Paolo Conte. 
 The song played when Tony meets Irina for an illicit rendezvous but is interrupted by Silvio is "Tenderly" by Chet Baker. 
 The song played over the end credits is "Complicated Shadows" by Elvis Costello.
 The song that Meadow and her choir sing is "All Through the Night", a Welsh song Ar Hyd y Nos with English lyrics.

References

External links
"Denial, Anger, Acceptance"  at HBO

The Sopranos (season 1) episodes
1999 American television episodes
Agunot

fr:À Bout de Souffle (Les Soprano)